Michele Carrascosa (1774–1853) was a Neapolitan general and politician.

Born to a Spanish family in Naples that came to Italy with Charles III of Spain, Carrascosa was, along with his brother Rafaelle, a career soldier. He fought against the French in the Battle of Lodi in 1796, in which he was wounded, but later joined the French-allied Parthenopean Republic. When the short-lived republic fell, Carrascosa was captured and exiled by Bourbon troops. He joined the French forces in the Peninsular War in Spain before returning to Naples, which was now a Kingdom controlled by Napoleon's brother-in-law, Joachim Murat. Murat appointed Carrascosa military governor of Naples and made him a Baron of the Kingdom.

He was in command of the Neapolitan army during the Neapolitan War of 1815, where he signed the Treaty of Casalanza after Murat fled to Corsica. From 1815 he was a general in the army of the restored Kingdom of Two Sicilies.

Following a series of scandals in 1823, Carrascosa was again exiled from Naples, this time in England, and did not return until 1848, where he was once more in good standing with the kingdom, and was appointed to the House of Peers.

References

1774 births
1853 deaths
18th-century Neapolitan people
19th-century Neapolitan people
Italian people of Spanish descent
Italian commanders of the Napoleonic Wars
People of the Kingdom of Naples (Napoleonic)